World Without End is a six-issue comic book limited series, created by Jamie Delano and illustrated by John Higgins, released by DC Comics in 1990.

Publication history
Delano created the series between his run on Hellblazer and Animal Man.

Delano has said:

Plot summary

The story involves a battle of the sexes in the future.

Reception
Black Gate magazine described the series as "everything comics have the potential to achieve…a psychic thought-bomb of words and pictures that blew my mind to bloody smithereens". They finished their review by saying that World Without End is:

Collected editions
Dover Books has collected the series into a single volume with an afterword by Stephen R. Bissette:
 World Without End: The Complete Collection (hardcover, 192 pages, October 2016)

Notes

References

External links
World Without End on the DC wiki
World Without End at ComicVine